St. Therese Church, west of Beattyville, Kentucky, was listed on the National Register of Historic Places in 2012.

It is a wood-frame church on a concrete block foundation.  It was built in 1948 from materials of the Contrary Creek Settlement School Church, a previous church located about a mile away, which had been built in the 1920s.  The new church was built to a different design.  Kitchen and living quarters for Catholic nuns and for the circuit-riding priest were added.

References

Churches completed in 1948
Roman Catholic churches in Kentucky
National Register of Historic Places in Lee County, Kentucky
Churches on the National Register of Historic Places in Kentucky
1948 establishments in Kentucky